Girlie was a hit for jazz/pop trio, The Peddlers in 1970. It was also a major hit for them in New Zealand.

Background
The song which was composed by Roy Phillips was released on CBS 4720 in January, 1970. It was backed with "P.S. I Love You Girlie".  As a follow up to their Top 10 hit "Birth", it didn't do as well and was a minor success. New Zealand was where the song would be a classic.  Along with "Birth", "Girlie" is from their Birthday album.

It was also covered by Patty Pravo and released as "Il Mio Fiore Nero". Lucio Dalla did a version of the song which appears on his Terra di gaibola album.

Chart performance
Spending a total of four weeks in the UK singles chart, it peaked at No. 34 on January 31, 1970. However in New Zealand it had had a large impression and was hugely popular, giving them their highest charting single. It hit the no. 1 spot there in May 1970.

References

External links
 IT Wikipedia: Per te/Il mio fiore nero

Number-one singles in New Zealand
1970 singles
1970 songs
CBS Records singles
Songs written by Roy Phillips
The Peddlers songs